Nasar is a small city in Pain Rokh Rural District, Jolgeh Rokh District, Torbat-e Heydarieh County, Razavi Khorasan Province, Iran. At the 2016 census, its population was 3,633, in 1,088 families.

References 

Populated places in Torbat-e Heydarieh County